The men's 400 metres at the 1954 European Athletics Championships was held in Bern, Switzerland, at Stadion Neufeld on 25, 26, and 27 August 1954.

Medalists

Results

Final
27 August

Semi-finals
26 August

Semi-final 1

Semi-final 2

Heats
25 August

Heat 1

Heat 2

Heat 3

Heat 4

Heat 5

Heat 6

Participation
According to an unofficial count, 25 athletes from 14 countries participated in the event.

 (2)
 (1)
 (2)
 (2)
 (1)
 (2)
 (2)
 (2)
 (2)
 (1)
 (2)
 (2)
 (2)
 (2)

References

400 metres
400 metres at the European Athletics Championships